Alme may refer to:

Alme (river), a tributary of the Lippe in Germany
Almè, a municipality in the province of Bergamo, Italy
Alme, Cameroon, a village in Adamawa Region
Almé Z, a sire of show jumping horses
Almeh, a type of female entertainers in Egypt
Alme (surname)